Onawa may refer to:

Places
 Onawa, Iowa, a city in Monona County, Iowa
 Onawa, Maine, a populated place in Piscataquis County, Maine 
 Onawa, Namibia, a settlement in the Omusati Region, Namibia

People
 Onawa Lacy (born 1982), American beauty pageant

Other uses
 Onawa IOOF Opera House, an opera house in Onawa, Iowa
 Onawa train wreck, a 1919 railroad accident near Onawa, Maine